In enzymology, a GTP cyclohydrolase II is an enzyme that catalyzes the chemical reaction

GTP + 3 H2O  formate + 2,5-diamino-6-hydroxy-4-(5-phosphoribosylamino)pyrimidine + diphosphate

Thus, the two substrates of this enzyme are GTP and H2O, whereas its 3 products are formate, 2,5-diamino-6-hydroxy-4-(5-phosphoribosylamino)pyrimidine, and diphosphate.

This enzyme belongs to the family of hydrolases, those acting on carbon-nitrogen bonds other than peptide bonds, specifically in cyclic amidines.  The systematic name of this enzyme class is GTP 7,8-8,9-dihydrolase (diphosphate-forming). Other names in common use include guanosine triphosphate cyclohydrolase II, and GTP-8-formylhydrolase.  This enzyme participates in riboflavin metabolism.

Structural studies

References

 

EC 3.5.4
Enzymes of known structure